Jonathan Cook (born 1965) is a British writer and a freelance journalist based in Nazareth, Israel, who writes about the Israeli–Palestinian conflict. He writes a regular column for The National of Abu Dhabi and Middle East Eye.

Background
Cook was born and raised in Buckinghamshire, England, UK.  He received a B.A. (Hons) in Philosophy and Politics from Southampton University in 1987, a postgraduate diploma in journalism from Cardiff University in 1989, and an M.A. in Middle Eastern studies from the School of Oriental and African Studies in 2000.

Career

Journalism
Cook was a freelance sub-editor with several national newspapers from 1994 until 1996. He was a staff journalist at The Guardian and The Observer between 1996 and 2001.

Since September 2001, Cook has been a freelance writer based in Nazareth, Israel.  Until 2007, he wrote columns for The Guardian.

In 2011, Cook received the Martha Gellhorn special award for journalism, "for his work on the Middle East". The award citation said Cook's work on Palestine and Israel made him "one of the reliable truth-tellers in the Middle East". 

His freelance articles have been published by a number of other publications such as the New Statesman, International Herald Tribune,  Le Monde Diplomatique, Al-Ahram Weekly, Al Jazeera, The National in Abu Dhabi, CounterPunch, The Electronic Intifada, Mondoweiss, and AlterNet.

Books
Cook has written three books. In Blood and Religion (2006), published by Pluto Press, the central thesis is that, "Israel is beginning a long, slow process of ethnic cleansing both of Palestinian non-citizens from parts of the occupied territories that it has long coveted for its expanded Jewish state, and of Palestinian citizens from inside its internationally recognized borders." Cook links this strategy to the Israeli perception of two threats: the physical threat of terrorism and the demographic threat of a Palestinian majority potentialised by high Palestinian birth rates and the continued demand for a Palestinian right of return. The Israeli leadership is also said by Cook to view the idea of a "state for all its citizens" as a threat. Rami George Khouri describes the short book as, "important but disturbing."

In 2008, Cook published Israel and the Clash of Civilizations: Iraq, Iran and the plan to remake the Middle East, published by Pluto Press. Of the book, Antony Loewenstein wrote that, "Cook bravely skewers the mainstream narrative of a Jewish state constantly striving for peace with the Palestinians." According to Lowenstein, Cook argues that Israel "pursues policies that lead to civil war and partition," and that this idea of dissolving many of the nations of the Middle East, shared by the neocons and the Bush administration, was developed by Israel's security establishment in the 1980s. Cook discusses an essay authored by Oded Yinon and published by the World Zionist Organization in 1982 which advocated for Israel's transformation into a regional imperial power via the fragmentation of the Arab world, "into a mosaic of ethnic and confessional groupings that could be more easily manipulated" (p. 107). A review of the book in The Jordan Times called it "well-researched and very readable."

Disappearing Palestine: Israel's Experiments in Human Despair was published in 2008 by Zed Books. The book is in two parts, with the second half consisting of reprints of website and newspaper articles written by Cook during the previous six years. The first half of the book, according to a review in The Electronic Intifada, explores the thesis that, "the goal of Israeli policy is to make Palestine and the Palestinians disappear for good." Helena Cobban in the Boston Review says Cook argues that to encourage voluntary emigration, Israel has made life unbearable for Palestinians, primarily via "the ever more sophisticated systems of curfews, checkpoints, walls, permits and land grabs."

Selected works

Books
(2006) Blood and Religion: The Unmasking of the Jewish and Democratic State. Pluto Press. 
(2008) Israel and the Clash of Civilizations: Iraq, Iran and the plan to remake the Middle East. Pluto Press. 
(2008) Disappearing Palestine: Israel's Experiments in Human Despair. Zed Books.

Chapters in books
(2005) "Unrecognized Villages: Indigenous 'Ayn Hawd versus Artists' Colony 'Ein Hod," in Nur Masalha, Catastrophe Remembered: Palestine, Israel, and the Internal Refugees, Zed Books, 
(2006) "Israel's Glass Wall: The Or Commission," in Joel Beinin and Rebecca L. Stein. The struggle for sovereignty: Palestine and Israel, 1993–2005. Stanford University Press. 
(2008). Foreword in Hatim Kanaaneh, A Doctor in Galilee: The Life and Struggle of a Palestinian in Israel. Pluto Press.

Articles
(2003) Declining to Intervene: Israel's Supreme Court and the Occupied Territories, Middle East Report, 4 August 2003.
(2004) Israeli Constitutional Committee Faces Double Bind, Adalah's Newsletter. Volume 7, pp. 1–7, August 2004.
with Lagerqiust, Peter. (2005) Crime and Punishment on Israel's Demographic Frontier, Middle East Report. No. 237, pp. 46–64, May 2005.
(2006) Israel’s “Demographic Demon” in Court, Middle East Report, 1 June 2006.
(2009) When and How Was the Jewish People Invented? Letter from Nazareth, review of Shlomo Zand's book, Holy Land Studies. Volume 8, pp. 113–117, May 2009.
(undated) The Stand-Tall Generation, review of Dan Rabinowitz and Khawla Abu-Baker, Coffins on Our Shoulders (2005) in Holy Land Studies. Volume 5, pp. 121–124.

Notes

External links
 
Cook's Guardian profile page .

1965 births
Living people
Alumni of Cardiff University
Alumni of SOAS University of London
Alumni of the University of Southampton
British expatriates in Israel
British male journalists
People from Nazareth
The Guardian journalists